Roquelaure (Ròcalaura in Gascon) is a commune in the Gers department in southwestern France. A type of knee-length cloak, which was worn by men in the 18th and 19th Centuries of the Common Era, is named for the commune.

Geography

History
The village is situated on a rocky height near the site of an Iron-Age oppidum and Gallo Roman villa on the neighboring hill of La Ciotat (La Sioutat). The ruins of Roman baths were found in the 18th century, which may be part of the same villa that was discovered more recently in 1898 and excavated in the 1960s.

The name Roquelaure means "laurel hill" in Gascon. A medieval fortified town was built at the current location sometime in the 12th century under the auspices of a lord of Roquelaure, and it received its charter (charte de coutumes) in 1244. From the 16th century on, the lords of Roquelaure built and maintained a chapel in the Gothic Church of Saint-Loup.  The lords of Roquelaure, including Antoine de Roquelaure (1544-1625), are buried in the church crypt. Antoine de Roquelaure built the nearby château of Rieutort and began refurbishing the castle at Lavardens, a project which was never completed. Francis I had a fort built on the northern slope of the village hill, guarding the road to Peyrusse-Massas, the ruins of which remain. The grounds of the fort have been the Robert Dauzère Stadium since 1969.

The former commune of Arcamont was joined to Roquelaure in 1952.

Government and politics

Mayors

Population

Viticulture
The lands of the commune of Roquelaure are classified as part of the Côtes de Montestruc and Côtes de Gascogne vin de pays zones. They are also part of the Haut-Armagnac zone.

Duchy
The seigneurie of Roquelaure was elevated to a duchy in 1652 in favor of Gaston-Jean-Baptiste de Roquelaure (1617-1683), son of Antoine de Roquelaure.

After this line died out, a different marquisate of Roquelaure was created in 1766 for their relatives, the lords of Saint-Aubin, today Roquelaure-Saint-Aubin.

See also
Communes of the Gers department

References

Further reading

External links

 Roquelaure. Community of Communes of the Cœur de Gascogne (in French).

Communes of Gers